Greatest Hits Live is the first live album and second greatest hits album by American singer-songwriter Carly Simon, released by Arista Records, on August 2, 1988.

Recorded on 35MM film for a HBO special shot on Martha's Vineyard originally titled Carly Simon – Coming Around Again, it was broadcast in June 1987 and later released on home video as Live From Martha's Vineyard. The album version runs in a different track order than the video version, and three tracks from the video version are removed: "Give Me All Night", "You Have To Hurt", and "The Stuff That Dreams Are Made Of". The track "The Right Thing to Do", cut from the final televised cut of the concert, is included on the album. It would later be included on both DVD releases of the concert as a bonus feature.

Release and reception

Greatest Hits Live was released on Vinyl, Cassette tape, and Compact disc. It sold very well upon release, going Gold immediately, and in 1996, it was officially certified Platinum by the Recording Industry Association of America (RIAA) for sales of one million copies in the United States alone. It was also certified Gold by both Music Canada on March 29, 1990, and the British Phonographic Industry (BPI) on July 12, 2019.

AllMusic rated the album 4 out of 5 stars, and commended the material as "well performed".

Track listing
Credits adapted from the album's liner notes.

Credits

Musicians

Production

Charts

Certifications

References

External links
 Carly Simon's Official Website

1988 greatest hits albums
1988 live albums
Carly Simon live albums
Arista Records live albums